Tempo–Sixmilecross Fault is a geological fault in County Fermanagh, Northern Ireland.

See also
List of geological faults in Northern Ireland

References
 Map sheet 44 (and accompanying memoir) of the series of 1:50,000 scale geological maps of Northern Ireland published by Geological Survey of Northern Ireland. 
 Lyle, P. 2003 Classic geology in Europe 5 The north of Ireland Terra Publishing, Harpenden

Geography of County Fermanagh
Seismic faults of Northern Ireland